Gongju National Museum is a national museum in Gongju, South Korea. The Gongju National Museum holds 10,000 artifacts including 19 national treasures and 3 treasures excavated in Daejeon and Chungcheongnam-do areas, especially artifacts from Tomb of King Muryeong.

Gallery

See also

List of museums in South Korea
National museum

References

External links
 Gongju National Museum Official Site

National museums of South Korea
Gongju
Museums in South Chungcheong Province